Faversham Miniature Railway is a miniature railway built to the unusual gauge of . It is unique in that it is the only 9 Inch Gauge railway open to paying passengers in UK.  It resides at Brogdale Farm near Faversham, Kent. The railway is maintained and operated entirely by volunteers and opens to paying passengers every Sunday, typically between the months of March & October.

History
The railway first opened in 1985 in Leysdown on the Isle of Sheppey as the 'Leysdown Coastal Railway, operating with a single steam locomotive and two sit-astride carriages. In 1987, the track was severely damaged by the Great Storm and forced to close.

Shortly afterwards, the railway relocated to Norton Ash Garden Centre and became Norton Ash Miniature Railway. The single steam locomotive was joined by a British Railway Class 35 'Hymek' replica and an electric locomotive named 'Bertie', both built by miniature railway suppliers Cromar White. After a considerable term at the garden centre, the railway was once again asked to move once since its presence did not fit with the landlords development plans for the site..

In 2001, the railway relocated to Brogdale Farm where it remains to this day.

In 2005, active volunteers formed a society to help to secure the future of the railway.

In 2009 an extension program began, taking the length of the line up from 1/4 mi to approximately 1 mi. By March 2012, the extension had opened to paying passengers.

As of 2022, operations have recommended since Lockdown and the Railway continues to upgrade its infrastructure and trackwork, with the platforms at Brogdale Central undergoing an extension program, plans to replace the Signalbox, and the doubling of track in certain areas to increase running and storage capacity for the line.

Both Class 31 and Class 20 locomotives have been rebuilt, whilst the Class 58 is on loan to the Torry Hill Railway.

Stations
 Brogdale Central

References

External links
Facebook
Brogdale Farm

Miniature railways in the United Kingdom
Transport in Faversham
Buildings and structures in Faversham